The Australian Public Service Commission (APSC) is a statutory agency of the Australian Government, within the Department of the Prime Minister and Cabinet, that acts to ensure the organisational and workforce capability to meet future needs and sustainability of the Australian Public Service (APS), that comprises approximately  people, or 0.8% of the Australian workforce.

The Commission was established pursuant to the Public Service Act 1999 and is led by the Australian Public Service Commissioner, currently Peter Woolcott , and the Merit Protection Commissioner, currently Linda Waugh. Both Commissioners work closely with the Minister Assisting the Prime Minister for the Public Service, currently Katy Gallagher. APSC employs around 200 staff, with offices in Canberra and Sydney.

The Commissioner reports annually to Australian Parliament on the state of the APS, including changes in the environment and infrastructure of the APS and emerging issues.

Functions
The vision of the Commission is to lead and shape a unified and high-performing Australian Public Service (APS). The Commission is responsible for providing advice to the Government on the APS; providing advice on strategic people management; supporting the implementation of Government policy; contributing to effective APS leadership and evaluating and reporting on the performance of the APS.

To this end, the Commission performs the following functions:

evaluates the extent to which agencies incorporate and uphold the values of the APS
evaluates the adequacy of systems and procedures in agencies for ensuring compliance with the APS Code of Conduct
promotes the APS Values and Code of Conduct
develops, promotes, reviews and evaluates APS employment policies and practices
facilitates continuous improvement in people management throughout the APS
coordinates and supports APS-wide training and career development
contributes to and fosters leadership in the APS
provides advice and assistance on public service matters to agencies on request
provides independent external review of actions by the Merit Protection Commissioner.

The systems and special reviews are undertaken at the direction of the Prime Minister.

See also
 Public Sector Management Program, an accredited standardised formal nationwide management training programme

References

External links
Australian Public Service Commission
APSC Submission to the Joint Committee of Public Accounts and Audit: Inquiry into the effects of the ongoing efficiency dividend on smaller public sector agencies; 2008.

National civil service commissions
Commonwealth Government agencies of Australia
Australian Public Service